The Union of Missionary Baptist Churches in Ivory Coast is a Baptist Christian denomination, affiliated with the Fédération Évangélique de Côte d’Ivoire and the Baptist World Alliance, in Ivory Coast. The headquarters is in Abidjan.

History
The Union of Missionary Baptist Churches in Ivory Coast has its origins in an American mission of the International Mission Board in 1966.  It was officially founded in 1979 as Baptist Meridional Evangelical Churches in Ivory Coast.   In 2006, it had 100 churches and 10,000 members. In 2016, Pastor Jean-Marie Djè-Bi-Djè of the Baptist Missionary Church of Babré-Gagnoa became the President of the Union. According to a denomination census released in 2020, it has 300 churches and 15,000 members.

References

External links
 Official Website

Baptist denominations in Africa
Evangelicalism in Ivory Coast